MBTS may refer to:

 Malaysia Baptist Theological Seminary in Malaysia
 Midwestern Baptist Theological Seminary in the United States